Aleksander Sołtan (31 July 1903 – 1994) was a Polish painter. His work was part of the painting event in the art competition at the 1936 Summer Olympics.

References

1903 births
1994 deaths
20th-century Polish painters
20th-century Polish male artists
Olympic competitors in art competitions
Artists from Kherson
Polish male painters